Leifeng may refer to:
 Leifeng Subdistrict (雷锋街道), a subdistrict in Wangcheng District, Changsha, Hunan, China
 Leifeng Pagoda (雷峰塔), a pagoda on the south bank of West Lake in Hangzhou, Zhejiang, China
 Leifeng Pagoda Music Ceremony (雷峰夕照音乐大典), a work for music ceremony composed and directed by He Xuntian.
 Leifeng Stadium (雷峰体育场), a multi-purpose stadium of Shuncheng District, Fushun, Liaoning, China
 Leifeng, Fujian (雷峰镇),  a township-level division of Fujian, China

See also 
 Lei Feng (雷锋; 1940–1962), Chinese Communist propaganda symbol